Punat is a municipality in the Primorje-Gorski Kotar County in western Croatia on the island of Krk. There are 1,973 inhabitants, with 90% Croats (2011). The town first appears in writings from AD 1377, but the exact date of foundation is not known. In the bay there is the little island of Košljun.

References

Municipalities of Croatia
Krk
Populated places in Primorje-Gorski Kotar County
Seaside resorts in Croatia